Eugène Nicolas Sartory (1871, Mirecourt – 1946) was an influential French archetier/ bow maker from Mirecourt, France. After having first apprenticed with his father, he went on to work in Paris for Charles Peccatte and Joseph Alfred Lamy (père) before setting up his own shop in 1889.

His bows are marked "E.SARTORY A PARIS". The apex of the trend toward heavy, strong bows was exemplified in the output of Eugène Sartory, who developed a style of bow to which his atelier adhered consistently for decades. He fortified the Voirin model, producing sturdily built bows with strong shafts. Later on Sartory innovated the design of his bows; widening the head and altering the shaft cross-section as well as thickening the shaft above the handle. These changes provided more stability and reliability in the handling. In his early period, Sartory preferred dark pernambuco wood, whereas the later bows are generally of lighter color.	

Vigneron and Fetique produced bows that at times could rival a Sartory in terms of strength and handling, but the consistency of Sartory bows has made them a perennial favorite among musicians even if they lack some of the subtlety of older bows. Sartory bows are utterly reliable as playing tools and will satisfy a wide variety of players.
His list of assistants includes Louis Morizot (perè), Jules Fetique & Louis Gillet. Hermann Wilhelm Prell worked for Sartory in Paris between 1897-1898.

Honors and awards
Eugène SARTORY won medals and prizes at various exhibitions and competitions :
1894 Lyon (France) International and Colonial Exhibition
1897 Bruxelles (date corrected thanks to Isaac Salchow)
1900 Paris (France) Universal and International Exhibition.
1905 Liege (Belgium) Universal and International Exhibition.
1906 Milan (Italy) Exposizione Internationale del Sempione
1908 London (Great-Britain) Franco-British Exhibition

Quotes

"The name Sartory is universally recognized due to the prolific and consistent output from the Sartory atelier. All of these qualities to make Sartory’s among the least difficult bows to sell. Consequently the margin between wholesale and retail pricing is narrower with Sartory bows than with other fine string instruments and bows." - Stefan Hersh

"Sartory bows are synonimous with reliability and consistency and are the  bow of choice for many professional musicians." - Gennady Filimonov

References

 The Strad - February 2019 p. 48-55. Filimonov, Gennady Sartory and the fake bows/ "Phoney War" 

 
 
 
 Dictionnaire Universel del Luthiers - Rene Vannes 1951,1972, 1985 (vol.3)
 Universal Dictionary of Violin & Bow Makers - William Henley 1970
 Eugène Nicolas Sartory: the modern classic of bow making

1871 births
1946 deaths
Luthiers from Mirecourt
Bow makers